Claudio Constantini is an internationally acclaimed multiinstrumentalist (pianist, bandoneonist) and composer born in Perú and currently living in Spain. Known for his eclectic nature and dazzling performances, he feels at home in a variety of musical genres.

Biography

Claudio Constantini holds an international and multi-faceted career as a performer of two instruments, the piano and the bandoneón, as well as being a composer in worldwide demand. Born and raised in Lima (Perú) into a musician's family, Constantini's unique style is defined by its solid classical roots paired with a passion for popular music genres, among which Latin American music and improvisation play a key role.

He has performed worldwide in top venues (such as Amsterdam's Concertgebouw, The Berlin Philharmonie, Vienna's Musikverein, The Los Angeles Opera house, among many others. 
Active in chamber music, he regularly collaborates with great artists such as Leticia Moreno, Ksenija Sidorova, and Rafael Aguirre, among others.

His latest Album AMERICA with piano music of George Gershwin and Astor Piazzolla has won him numerous outstanding reviews worldwide and has been nominated for a Latin Grammy (2019)in the category of "Best Classical Album." 
He is also in the process recording the complete piano Works of Claude Debussy, of which he has already released two albums. The first volume was selected among the 10 best albums of the year 2015 by Fanfare magazine (USA) and the second won him several recognitions. He has also collaborated in over a dozen productions for various artists.

Constantini has taught masterclasses at several institutions in Europe and abroad. He organizes the yearly "Primavera Pianistica" masterclasses and competition in Belgium, aimed at young pianists who wish to develop their artistry further.

He initiated his piano studies with his father (Gerardo Constantini) and later received his bachelor's degree in Finland, his master's degree in The Netherlands, and finally the diplome de concert in Paris, all of which earned him the highest distinctions. He was a pupil and eventually assistant of maestro Aquiles Delle Vigne, disciple of legendary pianists Claudio Arrau and Gyorgy Cziffra.

Awards and nominations
 2019 - Latin Grammys, nominated for best classical album.
 2008 - HSP Huygens award for master's degree studies in The Netherlands
 2005 - Astor Piazzolla International competition, 1st prize 
 2001 - Litmann Competition (NY), 1st prize

Discography
2013 – Suite Latinoamericana (Silvox)
2015 – Reflets dans l´eau (IBS Classical)
2016 – Obstinado (Claudio Constantini Quintet)
2018 – Debussy Complete Preludes (IBS Classical)
2018 – AMERICA (IBS Classical)

References

External links
 Official website

Bandoneonists
Peruvian pianists
Peruvian composers
Peruvian male composers
Living people
1983 births
Male pianists
21st-century pianists
21st-century male musicians